More Real Folk Blues: The Missing Album is an album by blues musician John Lee Hooker that was recorded in Chicago in 1966 at the same sessions for The Real Folk Blues but not released by the Chess label until 1991.

Reception

AllMusic reviewer Bill Dahl stated: "Produced by Ralph Bass in 1966 but not issued by Chess at the time, More Real Folk Blues was unearthed by MCA only a few years back. It's no masterpiece, but certainly deserved release in its daybacked by Burns and a Chicago rhythm section that copes as well as can be expected with Hooker's singular sense of timing".

Track listing
All compositions credited to John Lee Hooker
 "This Land Is Nobody's Land" – 4:31
 "Deep Blue Sea" – 3:35
 "Nobody Knows" – 4:24
 "Mustang Sally & GTO" – 4:38
 "Lead Me" – 4:44
 "Catfish" – 7:25
 "I Can't Quit You Baby" – 3:27
 "Want Ad Blues" – 6:09
 "House Rent Blues" – 3:49

Personnel
John Lee Hooker – guitar, vocals
Lafayette Leake – piano, organ (tracks 2, 4, 5 & 7-9)
Eddie Burns – guitar
Other unidentified musicians – bass, tambourine
Fred Below – drums

References

John Lee Hooker albums
1991 albums
albums produced by Ralph Bass
Chess Records albums